Kendal Broadie is an American biologist specializing in genetic dissection of nervous system development, function and plasticity, currently the Eldon Stevenson, Jr. Professor at Vanderbilt University.

References

Vanderbilt University faculty
21st-century American biologists
University of Oregon alumni
Year of birth missing (living people)
Living people
Place of birth missing (living people)
American neuroscientists